Caladenia grampiana, commonly known as the Grampians spider orchid is a plant in the orchid family Orchidaceae and is endemic to the Grampians National Park in Victoria. It is a ground orchid with a single hairy leaf and a one or two pale tawny-yellow or pinkish flowers similar to those of Caladenia oenochila.

Description
The petals are similar to the sepals but shorter. Flowering occurs in August or September.

Taxonomy and naming
The species was first formally described by David L. Jones in 2006 and given the name Arachnorchis grampiana. The description was published in Australian Orchid Research. In 2007, Gary Backhouse changed the name to Caladenia grampiana and the change was published in The Victorian Naturalist.

Distribution and habitat
Caladenia grampiana is only known from the Grampians National Park where it grows in heathy woodland in well-drained soil.

Conservation
This species is classified as "vulnerable"  by the Victorian government. and is listed under the Flora and Fauna Guarantee Act 1988.

References

grampiana
Plants described in 2006
Endemic orchids of Australia
Orchids of Victoria (Australia)
Taxa named by David L. Jones (botanist)